The 1929 Auckland Rugby League season was its 20th. One of the key events of the season was the tour of the South Sydney side.

The First Grade Championship was won by Ponsonby who defeated Devonport in the final 5–0. Marist won the Thistle Cup for competition points accrued during the second round of matches where they went undefeated. They also won the Roope Rooster trophy after defeating Ponsonby in the final 17–9. They weren't finished yet, defeating the same opponent to win the Stormont Shield 28–14. This was the second consecutive year that they won both of those trophies.

Richmond entered a team into the B Grade which was arguably the first ever 'reserve grade' team in Auckland club rugby league. The B Grade competition was won by Point Chevalier who defeated Otahuhu in the final 13 points to 10. This earned Point Chevalier the right to playoff with Ellerslie who had come last in the A Grade championship losing all 14 of their matches. Ellerslie won the match by 5 points to 0 to remain in A Grade for 1930. Otahuhu beat Point Chevalier 11–0 to win the Stallard Cup which had previously been a knockout competition for the B Grade, however this season a full round robin was played before the final.

Season news and summary

Auckland Rugby League management
The annual report for the completed 1928 season revealed that £3272 was taken in gate receipts from club matches alone at Carlaw Park. The total from all matches was £4573 with £517 paid to injured players. A further £609 1s 3d was spent on maintenance and improvement at Carlaw Park. Clubs were also granted £326 18s 5d and charitable causes received £142 10s 4d. League assets including Carlaw Park were reported as £10,569 16s 4d, with a consolidated fund of £9810 11s 9d.

It was stated prior to the season that Auckland Rugby League would be concentrating much more on the club game and that no representative games would be played during it. This was in response to the 1928 season where a large representative program had been played along with the hosting of the touring England team. The Senior B competition was weakened considerably after the Kingsland team amalgamated with Grafton Athletic and moved up into the A Grade. The Senior B league was also ‘lowered in status’ with several of the stronger players moving into A grade sides.

On 23 April The New Zealand Herald published a lengthy summary of rugby league in Auckland from its beginnings in 1909 to the present day (1929).

The Otahuhu Trotting Club wrote to the Auckland Rugby League advising them that the league could make use of two playing grounds on its property on Tennessee Avenue in Mangere East.

New clubs and mergers 
On 2 April a new club was formed in Papatoetoe after a meeting was held in their town hall. It was decided to field three junior teams. This was not the Papatoetoe Panthers club which was formed at a much later date.

At a meeting of the Grafton Athletic and Kingsland Rovers League Football Clubs it was decided to amalgamate and become known as Kingsland Athletic. The meeting was attended by 80 members. They decided that their colours would be a maroon jersey with a blue and gold shield. They requested to be placed in the Senior A Grade. A lengthy discussion was held at a management committee meeting before they agreed to accept the team in the A Grade. This made the number of teams in the grade 8. Their senior team was coached by former New Zealand captain Bert Avery who had been a playing member of Maritime/Grafton Athletic.

Rule changes 
A rule change brought in for the beginning of the season was to make each half 40 minutes in length rather than 45 minutes. Another rule change occurred prior to round 5 with alterations to the play-the-ball rule. The idea was the prevent players from playing the ball to the side. Players had been allowed to turn their body and pass the ball from the foot to their own team. “On occasions the ball travelled but a few feet, which invariably resulted in players of both teams fighting for possessions on the ground. It must be said that too much of the game is wasted with players lying on the ball. Now it is necessary to play the ball, forwards or backwards, past the opposing player. Should it be kicked to the side, all players must stand outside the five yards limit before the ball can be handled by them”.

Player losses 
An ongoing issue for club league in Auckland, and indeed New Zealand were the continuing losses of top players to English clubs. Over three seasons nine players left to join professional English sides. Wigan signed Lou Brown, Ben Davidson and Len Mason, while Wilson Hall played for Leeds, and Roy Hardgrave, Trevor Hall, and Lou Hutt all joined St. Helens. T. Hanlon of the Richmond club signed for Broughton Rangers club late in the season.

Improvements to Carlaw Park 
After a series of very wet matches played at Carlaw Park and many requests for improved changing and washing conditions the Auckland Rugby League met to discuss the matter. They planned to “increase the showers and add hot water installations”. The Devonport delegate said “his club now shared the expense of a bus, and the team went to the Tepid Baths after each match. Another delegate said that hot water provision was required for curtain-raiser and other teams, which did not desire to leave the ground”. The league decided to begin with the work and complete it by Saturday week.

On 9 October the Management Committee met regarding the improvement of accommodation at Carlaw Park. Chairman Mr. George Rhodes said that an extra stand with dressing rooms would cost £12,000 which was money that the league did not have. The existing stand was taken up with 800 vice-presidents who gained free entry and so there was little revenue to be gained by adding to this area. He did however say that they were “keen to assist players in providing better dressing rooms and offices where the League could centralise its business.

South Sydney tour 
South Sydney became the first ever Australian club to tour New Zealand. They played three matches. Two were played against Marist Old Boys at Carlaw Park on consecutive Saturdays and a midweek game was played against Huntly in Huntly. They were defeated in the first match 10–9, before winning the return match 25–5.

Monteith Shield (first grade championship) 
The Round 6 match between Richmond and Kingsland was postponed as Richmond had travelled to Hikurangi to play against the local team which was in its second season.

Monteith Shield standings 
{|
|-
|

Monteith Shield fixtures

Pre-season fixture
 On April 20 several pre-season matches were played at Carlaw Park involving first grade teams and senior B sides. Newton Rangers defeated Richmond Rovers by 10 points to 0 with Roy Hardgrave scoring a try and kicking a penalty and converting W. Johnstone's try.  Ellerslie United surprised Devonport United with a 5-5 draw. Marist Old Boys beat City 5-0, Kingsland Athletic beat Northcote & Birkenhead Ramblers 13-8, and Mount Wellington and Parnell played out a 0-0 draw. The senior B teams involved were Kingsland-Athletic, Parnell, Mount Wellington, and Northcote.

Round 1 
During the season Craddock Dufty who had starred for Auckland and New Zealand for several seasons fell out with the Newton club and asked for a transfer to Ellerslie. The Management Committee eventually granted the transfer.In the match between Newton and Marist Roy Hardgrave was concussed and had to leave the field. G Rhodes was also concussed later in the match and was taken to the hospital. For City in their match with Kingsland McLaughlin broke his nose and had to leave for treatment. Cyril Brimble had moved to Newton from the Manukau rugby club. His younger brother Ted Brimble would follow in the following season. And then in 1935 younger brother Wilfred would also join the ranks of Newton. Another brother Walter joined Manukau and he, Ted, and Wilfred, would all go on to represent New Zealand.

Round 2

Round 3

Round 4

Round 5
The Devonport win over Richmond was their 100th first grade win in their 20th consecutive year in first grade. To this point they had a 100 win, 12 draw, and 85 loss record.

Round 6
Alan Clarke was sent off in the Marist v City game for questioning the referee.

Round 7
In the match between Marist and Devonport both Ernest Ruby and Campney were sent off for fighting late in the match. For Newton Craddock Dufty refused to play in protest against the non-selection of Wally Somers. As a result Newton cancelled his registration with the club. Somers also decided to retire at this point though he ultimately joined the Ellerslie team for the 1930 season. Dufty then signed with Ellerslie where he had moved to earlier in the year. Cook was sent off in Ellerslie’s match for arguing with a referring decision.

Round 8

Round 9

Round 10

Round 11

Round 12
W. Shortland, an ex-Maori All Black transferred to City Rovers and made his debut for them. He had previously represented North Auckland at the halfback position. Shortland was said to have played a “sterling game, demonstrating that the thirteen-a-side code suited his particular type of play”. P Skelton also transferred from rugby where he had been playing five eighth for the Grammar Old Boys club. He joined the Ponsonby side and scored a try on debut and also set up their second try for W. Skelton (no relation). Their match was originally scheduled to be played on the number one field as a curtain-raiser but was transferred to the number two field as the former was in a poor condition however the number two ground “soon became a sea of mud”. The Marist and Ellerslie match at the Auckland Domain was postponed as the field was deemed unfit for play. The condition of Carlaw Park was so bad that it was discussed at the management committee meeting later in the week and it was decided that conditions needed to be improved for players immediately.

Round 13
R.D. Revell transferred from Ponsonby to Kingsland during the week.

Round 14
T Hanlon of the Richmond senior side was signed by Broughton Rangers in England. He was due to depart on the Ruahine on August 21.

Postponed round 12 match

Postponed round 6 match
The Round 6 match which was postponed saw Richmond default to Kingsland.

Final

Roope Rooster knockout competition
Marist won the Roope Rooster for the second consecutive year after defeating Ponsonby 17–9 in the final.

Round 1
A Berridge joined Richmond after transferring from rugby where he had been an Auckland representative player. He kicked 4 penalties on debut against Devonport in a 17–12 victory. In the match between Ponsonby and Newton, White (the Ponsonby fullback) had to leave the field with a broken collarbone early in the second half. Hammond then left the field with an injured neck and Kenneth Peckham followed him soon after, also injured.

Semi final

Final

Stormont Memorial Shield
Frank Delgrosso went off in the second half with an injured knee.

Top try scorers and point scorers
Top try and point scorers for A Division and Roope Rooster matches. Frank Delgrosso became just the second player in the competition's history to pass the 100 point mark for matches played in the Monteith Shield (for the first grade competition) and the Roope Rooster when he scored 108 for Ponsonby. The only previous player to do it was Bill Davidson who scored 117 points in 1922. By this point Delgrosso had scored 532 points in total for Ponsonby across all senior matches from 1919 to 1929 which was the most of any player who had played in Auckland to this point. Craddock Dufty was on 495 points however with both players still active they would continue to add to their tallies. Phil Brady of Marist was the top try scorer with 13 closely followed by Schofield of Ponsonby who scored 12.

B grade standings and results 
The Round 5 match between Northcote and Mangere resulted in a win to the former team but the actual score was not stated. The standings include the final played between Otahuhu and Point Chevalier, won by the latter by 13 points to 10.
{|
|-
|

Senior B grade fixtures 
In the first round of the season Mangere began their match with Otahuhu with just ten players, though had reached thirteen near halftime. It was the first time league had been played on the newly acquired Mangere Domain.

On 8 May at the Management Committee meeting Northcote requested that the opening round match in the Senior B competition be awarded to them on account of Richmond B defaulting. However the league said that the match would be replayed at the end of the season if it would affect the outcome of the competition.

The Round 8 match between Otahuhu and Point Chevalier was held at Papatoetoe which was the first senior match played in the area. Around 1,000 spectators turned up to watch the match. Otahuhu won a close fought match 10–6.

After Round 10 was completed the Auckland Rugby League decided that the match between Point Chevalier and Otahuhu would decide the championship. The match was played on Carlaw Park and saw Point Chevalier win by 13 points to 10.

Senior A/Senior B promotion-relegation match 
Ellerslie had come last in the A Grade for the second year in a row. Though unlike the previous season where they had won 3 matches in 1929 they were winless after battling injuries and the loss of players. However they managed to defeat Point Chevalier, who had won the B Grade by 5 points to 0 and thus remain in the A Grade for the 1930 season.

Stallard Cup competition

Lower grades and exhibition games

Lower grades 
Richmond won the Davis Shield for lower grade points accumulated once again. They would dominate this trophy throughout the 1920s and 30s.

Lower grade competitions

Second Grade
Devonport won the championship after sealing it in round 14 with a 12-0 win over Kingsland. Mount Albert finished runner up just 1 point behind. Mount Albert won the knockout competition when they defeated Devonport on September 28. Mangere had entered a team in the competition but withdrew after defaulting their first two games. The amalgamated New Lynn and Glen Eden club (Glen Lynn) entered a team in the knockout competition, drawing with Newton 6-6, before losing to Ponsonby 18-0.
 The knockout competition was won by Mount Albert United.
{|
|-
|

Third grade open (Hayward Shield)
Richmond won the championship by one point ahead of Ponsonby B. Richmond also won the knockout competition with a 18-0 win over Ellerslie in the final on September 21. They had beaten Ponsonby B by default a week earlier while Ellerslie had upset Kingsland 11-5 in the other. Ellerslie had suprisingly made it to the final after only winning two matches during the championship. The majority of the results were reported and the final standings were published in the newspaper which was very unusual in these early decades.
{|
|-
|

Third grade intermediate
The championship was won by Devonport, 3 points ahead of Akarana. The knockout competition was won by Newmarket 7 to 6 on September 28, though the score was also reported as 10-6. Devonport had beaten City by default in one semi final while Newmarket won the other semi final 12-2 against Akarana. Newton entered a team in the competition but they withdrew without playing a game, while Mount Albert withdrew after 10 rounds having only played 7 games. 
{|
|-
|

Fourth grade (Hospital Cup)
Devonport won the championship undefeated with 16 wins from 16 games, scoring 356 points and only conceding 32. Richmond were runners up 9 further points back. Devonport also won the knockout competition when they beat Richmond 12-5 in the final on October 19. Devonport had won their semi final 6-0 over Akarana, while Richmond beat Kingsland 7-6 in the other semi final. Mt Wellington withdrew from the championship after 9 rounds while Remuera withdrew also after playing 9 games but in the 12 rounds having defaulted for 3 weeks.
{|
|-
|

Fifth grade (Endean Shield)
Richmond won the championship and also the knockout competition. They defeated Marist 14-9 in the knockout final on 21 September following a semi final win over Point Chevalier by 14 points to 4 while Marist had beaten Kingsland in the other semi final. Otahuhu had initially entered a side but failed to take the field and withdrew after round 1. A table was published in the newspapers after 7 rounds however many of the results in the second half of the season were not reported so the final standings are incomplete.
{|
|-
|

Sixth grade A (Walker Shield)
Richmond won the championship ahead of Otahuhu and Marist. Otahuhu won the knockout competition when they beat Richmond 11-6 in the final on October 12. Otahuhu had beaten City in one semi final while Richmond beat Kingsland 11-0 in the other semi final. The standings were reported after 8 rounds but the final standings were not reported and many results were also not reported so the following table is incomplete.
{|
|-
|

Sixth grade B (Myers Cup)
Richmond B won the championship with a remarkable point scoring record with well over 500 points scored with the majority of their wins coming at 0 points conceded. They also won the Milicich knockout final when they beat Northcote 16-2 on September 28. They had beaten Newton 5-3 in their semi final, while Northcote defeated Point Chevalier 2-0 in the other semi final. The championship standings were reported after 8 rounds but not again thereafter. The following table has been put together using those standings plus the results that were reported over the remainder of the season.

References

External links 
 Auckland Rugby League Official Site

Auckland Rugby League seasons
Auckland Rugby League